Georges Fouquet (1862 – 1957) was a French jewelry designer best known for his Art Nouveau creations. In Paris, he joined his father in the family business in 1891 In 1900 he opened a new jewelry shop at 6 rue Royale in Paris, designed by the illustrator  Alphonse Mucha. The interior of the shop is preserved at the Carnavalet Museum in Paris. Contrary to Lalique but like Henri Vever, Georges Fouquet expressed himself through more synthetic geometric forms. In 1900, Fouquet was featured at the Exposition Universelle in Paris. He also designed jewels for French actresses such as Sarah Bernhardt. Pieces of his work can be found at the Metropolitan Museum of Art, the Victoria and Albert Museum, the Petit Palais. The Carnavalet Museum in Paris has a recreation of the shop of Georges Fouquet

References

French jewellers
1862 births
1957 deaths